The ADR-8 was an unguided electronic countermeasures rocket developed by Tracor for use by the United States Air Force. It was used to dispense chaff from Boeing B-52 Stratofortress bombers.

Development
Originally given the designation RCU-2, the ADR-8 was developed for use by the Boeing B-52 Stratofortress strategic bomber, to give the aircraft a means of dispensing chaff to disrupt enemy radar. Developed by Tracor under a Quick Reaction Contract, the ADR-8 was a folding fin rocket of  diameter. Following successful testing, production of the rocket was undertaken by Revere Copper and Brass.

Operational use
The rockets were fired from 20-shot AN/ALE-25 rocket pods mounted on pylons under the wings of the B-52s. They were installed on the final 18 B-52H aircraft constructed; earlier B-52Gs and B-52Hs were retrofitted with the system.

The ADR-8 and AN/ALE-25 were retired in September 1970, replaced by the "Phase VI" electronic warfare suite.

References

Citations

Bibliography

Cold War rockets of the United States
Weapons countermeasures
Boeing B-52 Stratofortress
Military equipment introduced in the 1960s